The Night We Met may refer to:

 "The Night We Met" (Lord Huron song), 2017
 "The Night We Met" (HomeTown song), 2015

See also
 The Night We Never Met, a 1992 film by Warren Leight